The Lake Argyle Islands are a large group of islands in Lake Argyle, created by the Ord River Dam on the Ord River in the Kimberley region of Western Australia. There are nearly 70 islands with official names, including most of the larger islands, as well as some small rocky outcrops.

Formation
The islands are former elevated points and ranges found on what used to be a section of Argyle Cattle Station, prior to the damming of the Ord River  in 1971. As the lake filled, the lower grasslands became submerged while higher places along ranges became newly formed islands. The dam has never, and highly unlikely to be dry, thus ensuring most islands are permanent. As the lake level often changes islands can grow, shrink, disappear and reappear according to water levels. Some islands have rocky or sandy beaches and quite a range of flora and fauna, while others are swampy/fully rock and are quite barren.

List

Chinyin Group
Chinyin Island and two other smaller islands, all located close to the dam wall. Small, slightly hilly islands in a barren, arid landscape.

Yambaraba Group
Yambaraba Island is the sole permanent member of the Yambaraba Group. The island is fairly barren, though has beaches and a small hill in the centre.

See also
 Lake island

References
 https://www.abc.net.au/news/rural/2014-06-04/remote-island-on-lake-argyle-wa/5499376
 https://www.abc.net.au/news/2014-08-31/lake-argyle-future-development-of-australia-north/5708436
 http://www.epa.wa.gov.au/proposals/application-prospecting-licence-801138-remote-island-lake-argyle
 https://www.travelin.com.au/articles/Lake-Argyle-WA-03965
 https://ebird.org/hotspot/L3875165?yr=all&m=&rank=mrec

External links
 http://www.lakeargyle.com/explore-and-learn/ecosystem/

Islands of the Kimberley (Western Australia)
Lake islands of Australia